Jean Lafoucrière (born 4 June 1856, date of death unknown) was a French fencer. He competed in the men's masters épée event at the 1900 Summer Olympics.

References

External links
 

1856 births
Year of death missing
French male épée fencers
Olympic fencers of France
Fencers at the 1900 Summer Olympics
Sportspeople from Allier
Place of death missing